General elections were held in Paraguay on 11 February 1968. Alfredo Stroessner of the Colorado Party won the presidential elections, whilst the Colorado Party won 20 of the 30 seats in the Senate and 40 of the 60 seats in the Chamber of Deputies. Voter turnout was 73.1%.

This would be the lowest vote share Stroessner would claim in the six elections in which he nominally faced an opponent; on the other occasions, he claimed to win by margins of well over 80 percent. It would also be the only time in Stroessner's 35-year tenure that an opposition candidate would manage even 20 percent of the vote.

Results

References

Paraguay
1968 in Paraguay
Elections in Paraguay
Presidential elections in Paraguay
Alfredo Stroessner
February 1968 events in South America